The winners of the 1997 Governor General's Literary Awards were announced on November 18 by Donna Scott, Chairman of the Canada Council for the Arts.  Each winner received a cheque for $10,000.

English

Fiction
 Jane Urquhart, The Underpainter
Sandra Birdsell, The Two-Headed Calf
Matt Cohen, Last Seen
Elizabeth Hay, Small Change
Eric McCormack, First Blast of the Trumpet Against the Monstrous Regiment of Women

Poetry
 Dionne Brand, Land to Light On
Marilyn Bowering, Autobiography
Patrick Friesen, A Broken Bowl
Carole Glasser Langille, In Cannon Cave
Don McKay, Apparatus

Drama
 Ian Ross, FareWel
Maureen Hunter, Atlantis
Lee MacDougall, High Life
Jason Sherman, Reading Hebron
Judith Thompson, Sled

Non-fiction
 Rachel Manley, Drumblair – Memories of a Jamaican Childhood
Wade Davis, One River: Explorations and Discoveries in the Amazon Rain Forest
Catherine Dunphy, Morgentaler: A Difficult Hero
Terry Glavin, This Ragged Place – Travels Across the Landscape
Blair Stonechild and Bill Waiser, Loyal till Death – Indians and the North-West Rebellion

Children's Literature – Text
 Kit Pearson, Awake and Dreaming
Cheryl Foggo, One Thing That's True
James Heneghan, Wish Me Luck
Teddy Jam, The Fishing Summer
Barbara Nichol, Dippers

Children's Literature – Illustrations
 Barbara Reid, The Party
Blair Drawson, Flying Dimitri
Marie-Louise Gay, Rumpelstiltskin
Robin Muller, The Angel Tree
Ludmila Zeman, The First Red Maple Leaf

Translation – French to English
 Howard Scott, The Euguelion
Jane Brierley, Canadians of Old
Patricia Claxton, Baroque at Dawn
David Homel, A Drifting Year
Nancy Huston, The Goldberg Variations

French

Fiction
 Aude, Cet imperceptible mouvement
Bernard Assiniwi, La Saga des Béothuks
Lise Bissonnette, Quittes et Doubles – Scènes de réciprocité
Pierre Morency, La Vie entière – Histoires naturelles du Nouveau Monde
Pierre Ouellet, Légende dorée

Poetry
 Pierre Nepveu, Romans-fleuves
Nicole Brossard, Vertige de l'avant-scène
Serge Legagneur, Poèmes choisis, 1961–1997
Paul Chanel Malenfant, Fleuves
Hélène Monette, Plaisirs et Paysages kitsch

Drama
 Yvan Bienvenue, Dits et Inédits
Jasmine Dubé, La Bonne Femme
Marie-Line Laplante, Une tache sur la lune
Robert Marinier, L'Insomnie
Larry Tremblay, Ogre – Cornemuse

Non-Fiction
 Roland Viau, Enfants du néant et mangeurs d'âmes – Guerre, culture et société en Iroquoisie ancienne
Fernand Dumont, Une foi partagée
Yolande Geadah, Femmes voilées, intégrismes démasqués
Alain Bernard Marchand, Tintin au pays de la ferveur
François Ricard, Gabrielle Roy – Une vie

Children's Literature – Text
 Michel Noël, Pien
Dominique Demers, Maïna, tomes 1 et 2
Agathe Génois, Sarah, je suis là!
Jacques Godbout, Une leçon de chasse
Maryse Pelletier, Une vie en éclats

Children's Literature – Illustrations
 Stéphane Poulin, Poil de serpent, dent d'araignée
Leanne Franson, L'Ourson qui voulait une Juliette
Stéphane Jorisch, Casse-Noisette
Gilles Tibo, Simon et le petit cirque

Translation – English to French
 Marie José Thériault, Arracher les montagnes
François Barcelo, La Face cachée des pierres
Nicole Côté, Verre de tempête
Pierrot Lambert, L'Insight: Étude de la compréhension humaine

Governor General's Awards
Governor General's Awards
Governor General's Awards